Coastal Recreation, Inc was an American boat builder based in Costa Mesa, California. The company specialized in the design and manufacture of fiberglass sailboats designed by well-known naval architects, including Lyle C. Hess, Peter Barrett and W. Shad Turner.

The company was founded in 1968 and remained in business until 1981. The American east coast sailboat builder, RK Industries, was a subsidiary company.

History
The first design produced was the Balboa 20 and this was quickly followed by a series of Balboa and Aquarius boats, all small, cruising boats with an emphasis on road transport by boat trailer.

The company formed a  subsidiary sailboat builder, RK Industries, on the US east coast at Strasburg, Virginia, which built the RK 20 and RK 21.

The company was purchased by Laguna Yachts, moved to Laguna's headquarters in Stanton, California and became a subsidiary, before being shut down. Laguna Yachts itself went out of business in 1986, following the early 1980s recession.

Boats 
Summary of boats built by Coastal Recreation:

Balboa 20 - 1968
Aquarius 21 - 1969
Aquarius 23 - 1969
Balboa 21 - 1969
Balboa 23 - 1969
Balboa 26 - 1969
Aquarius 23-2 - 1970
Ensenada 20 - 1972
RK 20 - 1972
RK 21 - 1972
La Paz 25 - 1973
Balboa 27 8.2 - 1976
Balboa 22 - 1977
Balboa 16 - 1981
Balboa 24 - 1981

See also
List of sailboat designers and manufacturers

References

Coastal Recreation, Inc